Piotr Ibrahim Kalwas (born 4 November 1963) is a Polish novelist, journalist, and twice nominated for the Nike Literary Award.

Biography 
Piotr Ibrahim Kalwas was born in 1963 in Powiśle, Warsaw to a family of Catholics in Poland. His father is a former Minister of Justice of Poland, Andrzej Kalwas. In his youth, Piotr Kalwas was a member of the youth punk subculture. He studied at a university, but was expelled, and earned a living by taking simple jobs, most notably when he worked as an illegal immigrant construction painter in Norway for 3 years and where he met his wife, Agata. Then he became involved in business, most notably as a restaurant manager in Warsaw, and he was among the writers of the popular Polish 1990s series "The World According to the Kiepski Family" (in his book, "Salam", Kalwas described "The World According to the Kiepski Family" as "the most intense show in the history of Polish television ").

In 2000, after long journeys to Asia and Africa, Kalwas converted to Islam and assumed the middle name of "Ibrahim". According to Kalwas himself, his religious views are close to Sufism, although he is not Sufi. In 2008, he moved to Egypt with his wife and son, and lived for 8 years in Alexandria from 2008 until 2016. Kalwas's life and work in Egypt became the main theme of his literary work – reportages for Polish media and several books. Kalwas lived in Egypt for eight years, but after publishing the book "Egypt: Haram, Halal" he left the country because of concerns about personal and family safety, considering the critical nature of his books and reports about   Egyptian society, even   the Egyptian government in some instances.

He currently lives in Gozo, Malta. He's married and has a son.

Novels 

 Salam, 2003
 Czas, 2005 – nominated for the Nike Literary Award 2006, the action takes place in Eritrea
 Drzwi, 2006
 Rasa mystica: traktat około Indii, 2008
 Dom, 2010
 Tarika, 2012
 Międzyrzecz, 2013
 Egipt: Haram Halal, 2015 (reportage) – nominated for the Nike Literary Award 2016
 Archipelag Islam, 2018
Gozo. Radosna siostra Malty, 2020
 Dziecko Księżyca, 2021
 Marhaba, 2022

References 

Polish writers
Converts to Islam from Catholicism
1963 births
Living people
Polish Muslims
Polish journalists
Writers from Warsaw